The 1980 United States Senate election in Illinois was held on November 4, 1980. Incumbent Democrat U.S. Senator Adlai Stevenson III decided to retire. Democrat Alan J. Dixon won the open seat.

Election information
The primaries and general elections coincided with those for other federal offices (President and House), as well as those for state offices.

Background
Incumbent Democrat Adlai Stevenson III opted not to seek reelection to a third-term. This was the first open-race for this senate seat since 1938.

Turnout
Turnout in the primary elections was 35.36%, with a total of 2,026,814 votes cast.

Turnout during the general election was 73.51%, with 4,579,933 votes cast.

Democratic primary 
Alan J. Dixon overwhelmingly won the Democratic primary.

Candidates
 Alan J. Dixon, Illinois Secretary of State
 Anthony R. Martin-Trigona, candidate for U.S. Senator in 1978
 Alex Seith, Democratic nominee for U.S. Senator in 1978
 Robert Ash "Bob" Wallace
 Dakin Williams, prosecutor, candidate for U.S. Senator in 1972 and 1974, candidate for Illinois Governor in 1978

Campaign
Alex Seith, who had won the Democratic nomination for Senator two years earlier, almost winning the 1978 race in what would have been a major upset, laid hopes of capturing the nomination again.

Anthony R. Martin-Trigona, a political activist who had unsuccessfully sought the nomination for senate in 1978, again ran for the nomination.

Robert Ash "Bob" Wallace made use of his friendship with boxer Muhammad Ali, featuring him in campaign ads and having him make campaign appearances.

Dakin Williams was a prosecutor, and was the younger brother of famous playwright Tennessee Williams. He had been a candidate for the Democratic nomination of Illinois' other US Senate seat in 1972, and had unsuccessfully sought the nomination for this seat in 1974. He had also been a candidate for governor in 1978.

Results

Republican primary

Candidates
 Richard E. Carver, Mayor of Peoria, Illinois
 Dave O'Neal, Lieutenant Governor of Illinois
 William J. Scott, Illinois Attorney General

Results

General election

See also 
 1980 United States Senate elections

References 

1980
Illinois
United States Senate